VERSAdos is an operating system dating back to the early 1980s for use on the Motorola 68000 development system called the EXORmacs which featured the VERSAbus and an array of option cards. They were typically connected to CDC Phoenix disk drives running one to four 14-inch platters. The EXORmacs was used to emulate a 680xx processor in-circuit, speeding development of 680xx based systems. It also hosted several compilers and assemblers.

VERSAdos and the EXORmacs were produced by Motorola's Microsystems Division.

Overview
VERSAdos was a real-time, multi-user operating system. It was the follow on product to the single user MDOS that ran the 6800 development system called the EXORciser. 

Both systems features a harness with a CPU socket compatible connector.

A Modula 2 compiler was ported to VERSAdos.

Commands
The following list of commands and utilities are supported by VERSAdos.

 ^
 ACCT
 ARGUMENTS
 ASSIGN
 BACKUP
 BATCH
 BSTOP
 BTERM
 BUILDS
 BYE
 CANCEL
 CHAIN
 CLOSE
 CONFIG
 CONNECT
 CONTINUE
 COPY
 CREF
 DATE
 DEFAULTS
 DEL
 DIR
 DMT
 DUMP
 DUMPANAL
 ELIMINATE
 EMFGEN
 END
 FREE
 HELP
 INIT
 LIB
 LIST
 LOAD
 LOGOFF
 MBLM
 MERGEOS
 MIGR
 MT
 NEWS
 NOARGUMENTS
 NOVALID
 OFF
 OPTION
 PASS
 PASSWORD
 PATCH
 PROCEED
 PRTDUMP
 QUERY
 R?
 RENAME
 REPAIR
 RETRY
 SCRATCH
 SECURE
 SESSIONS
 SNAPSHOT
 SPL
 SPOOL
 SRCCOM
 START
 STOP
 SWORD
 SYSANAL
 TERMINATE
 TIME
 TRANSFER
 UPLOADS
 USE
 VALID

See also
CP/M-68K

References

External links
 http://bitsavers.org/pdf/motorola/versados/
 https://www.ricomputermuseum.org/collections-gallery/small-systems-at-ricm/motorola-exormacs-development-system

Discontinued operating systems
Motorola